Acacia redolens, commonly known as bank catclaw, prostrate acacia, or desert carpet, is a shrub of the genus Acacia and the subgenus Plurinerves.

Description

It is a dense, small to medium-sized shrub that usually reaches heights of 0.5 to 3, rarely up to 5 or even 7 meters. Vegetative parts of the plant and especially the yellow flowers give off an intense vanilla scent.

It blooms from August to October in its native range, and produces yellow flowers. The small flowers, whose optical effect is based on the yellow stamens, are located in the leaf axils. The brownish legumes are about 25 millimeters long and about 6 millimeters wide.

In California, it blooms from February through May (late winter to late spring). It is commonly planted by freeways and is found throughout Southern California and some parts of the Bay Area.

Phylogeny
According to the Catalogue of Life, Acacia contains 1067 species. A 2014 phylogenetic study of Acacia in Australia suggests the following phylogenetic relationships:

Distribution
It is native to an area along the southern coast in the Great Southern and Goldfields-Esperance regions of Western Australia. The plant is considered an invasive weed in areas of California where it was used as a fast growing groundcover along freeways. It is particularly problematic in the San Gabriel Valley and Mission Valley.

Acacia redolens thrives on salty or alkaline loamy, clayey, clayey-loamy or sandy soils and can be used as a groundcover. It occurs on the edges of salt lakes or in salty depressions and can withstand frost down to −7 °C.

See also

 List of Acacia species

External links

Atlas of Living Australia
CalFlora
Encyclopedia of Life
FloraBase
Global Biodiversity Information Facility
iNaturalist
Invasive.Org
Jepson eFlora
PlantNet
USDA National Resources Conservation Service
Useful Temperate Plants
World Wide Wattle

References

redolens
Acacias of Western Australia
Taxa named by Bruce Maslin
Plants described in 1974